Vino Rosso (foaled  March 29, 2015) is an American Thoroughbred racehorse who won the 2019 Breeders' Cup Classic.

Racing career
Vino Rosso made his racing debut on November 11, 2017 with a win at Aqueduct Racetrack. He then won his second race at Tampa Bay Downs on December 22, 2017.

At age three, his 2018 racing season started with a third place finish in the Grade 3 Sam F. Davis Stakes. He picked up his first Graded stakes race win on April 7, 2018, in the Grade 2 Wood Memorial Stakes. He competed in the 2018 Kentucky Derby, where he finished in 9th place. His season ended abruptly in August.

His 2019 racing season was much more successful than his 2018 season. He started the season off with a win on March 9, 2019 in the Stymie Stakes. He then captured his biggest win up to that point when he won the Gold Cup at Santa Anita Stakes on May 27th, 2019. 

He came in third place at the Grade 1 Whitney Handicap on August 3, 2019 and ran second in the Grade 1 Jockey Club Gold Cup. He then finished his season on November 2, 2019, with a win at the Grade 1 Breeders' Cup Classic. This was ultimately his final race as he was retired in November 2019.

Pedigree

References

2015 racehorse births
Racehorses bred in Kentucky
Racehorses trained in the United States
Breeders' Cup Classic winners
American Grade 1 Stakes winners